The Football NSW 2016 season was the fourth season of football in New South Wales under the banner of the National Premier Leagues. The competition consisted of four divisions across the state of New South Wales. The Premiers of the NPL NSW Men's 1 qualified for the national finals, playing-off to decide the champion of the 2016 National Premier Leagues.

Pre-Season Changes

League Tables

2016 National Premier League NSW Men's 1

The National Premier League New South Wales 2016 season was played over 22 rounds, from March to August 2016.

Finals

2016 National Premier League NSW Men's 2

The 2016 National Premier League NSW Men's 2 was the fourth edition of the NPL NSW 2 as the second level domestic association football competition in New South Wales. 14 teams competed, playing each other twice for a total of 26 rounds, with the top team at the end of the year promoted to the NPL NSW Men's 1 competition. The league began on March 6 with the regular season concluding on August 28. The top 6 teams competed in the finals series.

Finals

2016 National Premier League NSW Men's 3

The 2016 National Premier League NSW Men's 3 was the fourth edition of the newly renamed NPL NSW Men's 3 to be incorporated under the National Premier Leagues banner. 12 teams competed, playing each other twice for a total of 22 rounds.

2016 NSW State League

The 2016 NSW State League was the fourth edition of the newly renamed State League to be incorporated under the National Premier Leagues banner. 12 teams competed, playing each other twice for a total of 22 matches.

Finals

2016 National Premier League NSW Women's 1

The 2016 National Premier League NSW Women's 1 was the third edition of the NPL NSW Women's competition to be incorporated under the National Premier Leagues banner. 10 teams competed, playing each other twice for a total of 18 rounds.

Finals

2016 Waratah Cup

Football NSW soccer clubs competed in 2016 for the Waratah Cup. The tournament doubled as the NSW qualifier for the 2016 FFA Cup, with the top five clubs progressing to the Round of 32, as well as the reigning National Premier Leagues champion (Blacktown City FC). 130 clubs entered the qualifying phase, with the clubs entering in a staggered format.

The competition was won by defending champions Sydney United 58, their 6th title, defeating Manly United.

In addition to the three A-League clubs (Central Coast Mariners, Sydney FC and Western Sydney Wanderers), the six qualifiers (Blacktown City, Bonnyrigg White Eagles, Manly United, Marconi Stallions, Sydney United 58 and Wollongong Wolves) competed in the final rounds of the 2016 FFA Cup. Of these qualifying clubs, Blacktown City progressed to the quarter-finals stage.

Awards 
The end of year awards were presented on 9 September 2016 at Rosehill Gardens

National Premier Leagues NSW

National Premier Leagues NSW 2

National Premier Leagues NSW 3

Other awards

References

2016 in Australian soccer